Kage may refer to:

Kage, Angola
 The Danish word for cake
 A former nickname used by Japanese singer Hironobu Kageyama
 Samuel Conway, also known as "Uncle Kage"
 Japanese for "shadow" written in rōmaji, used in:
 Kage-ryū, koryū (traditional) martial arts school of kenjutsu
 Aizu Kage-ryū, koryū (traditional) martial arts school of kenjutsu
 The player character in Legend of Kage
 Kage-Maru, the main character in the Virtua Fighter series of video games
 The Japanese release title for the video game Shadow of the Ninja
 The name of a ninja in the PlayStation game Suikoden
 The name of an underground information broker in the PlayStation 2 game Yakuza
 The nickname of Kyle Gass, a member of the band Tenacious D
 Another name for the main character in The Night Angel Trilogy by Brent Weeks
 A fanzine for the tabletop role-playing game Shadowrun